"Pakai Buang" is a song by Malaysian pop singer Stacy taken from her first studio album, Aku Stacy which was fully composed and written by Edry KRU. The song serves as the album's third single and it has been released to radio stations on 9 May 2009 and has received significant airplay since then.

Background 
It has been rumoured that the third single of the album was the teary ballad "Cinta Yang Ku Duga". However, Stacy has stated in an interview with mStar that "Pakai Buang" is her third single of the album.

Release

Promotion 
Stacy has previously performed the song during the road tour of Anugerah Bintang Popular 2008 across Malaysia, along with her hit singles "Aku Stacy" and "Gagap". As part of the single's promotion, Stacy also performed the song on Muzik Muzik on 14 May 2009 and also in the grand finale of the seventh season of Akademi Fantasia on 16 May 2009.

Charts

References 

2009 singles
Stacy (singer) songs
2008 songs